Jeffrey Neilson Taylor (20 September 1930 – 28 December 2010) was an English professional footballer who played in the Football League for Huddersfield Town, Fulham and Brentford as a forward. He went on to perform opera.

Football career 
In an eight-year career as a professional footballer, Taylor played in the First Division, Second Division and Third Division South of the Football League for Huddersfield Town, Fulham and Brentford respectively. Taylor scored in double-figures in his first two seasons with Huddersfield Town. He moved to Fulham in November 1951 and scored a hat-trick in one of his early appearances against Middlesbrough, before his music studies began to take precedence and he dropped out of the first team picture. He was Brentford's second-highest scorer in the 1956–57 season, his last in football. Taylor finished his career having scored 84 goals in 204 games. Looking back in 1997 on his premature retirement, Taylor said, "singing won the day. I had no long-term ambitions in football and I realised that it was impossible to marry the two".

Opera career 
While still a footballer, Taylor was able to use his wages to pay for his studies in singing and piano at the Royal Academy of Music. Taylor performed opera under the name "Neilson Taylor" and was a bass baritone. After retiring from football, he joined the Yorkshire Opera Company. Taylor moved on in 1962 to understudy Michel Roux in Pelléas et Mélisande and Walter Alberti and John Shirley-Quirk in L'incoronazione di Poppea at Glyndebourne. His time at Glyndebourne proved to be a breakthrough and he toured the world, spending time in Australia and a year at Mantua in Italy, which led to work at the Royal Opera House in Covent Garden and in Rotterdam. Taylor failed fully to deliver on his promise as a singer, but found fulfilment when he was made Professor of Singing at the Royal Scottish Academy of Music in Glasgow and he remained in the role for 18 years.

Personal life 
His younger brother, Ken Taylor also played football for Huddersfield. Ken was also a professional cricketer, playing three Tests for England and first-class cricket for Yorkshire. Ken's son (Jeff's nephew) Nick Taylor also played cricket for Yorkshire. While still a footballer, Taylor studied for a degree in Geography at London University. After retiring from teaching, Taylor retired to Yorkshire.

Career statistics

References

External links 

The Independent obituary, 29 January 2011. 

1930 births
2010 deaths
English footballers
Footballers from Huddersfield
Association football forwards
English Football League players
Huddersfield Town A.F.C. players
Fulham F.C. players
Brentford F.C. players
20th-century British male opera singers